Dimitrios Lolas (alternate spelling: Dimitris) (Greek: Δημήτριος Λόλας; born January 31, 1986) is a Greek professional basketball player for Niki Volou of the Greek 3rd division. At a height of 6'8" (2.03 m), he can play at both the power forward and center positions.

Professional career
Lolas began his pro career in Greece's top-tier level Greek Basket League, with Maroussi. He also played in the Greek Basket League with Aigaleo and Kavala.

National team career
Lolas was a member of the junior national teams of Greece. With Greece's junior national teams, he played at the following tournaments: the 2004 FIBA Under-18 European Championship, the 2005 FIBA Under-20 European Championship, and the 2006 FIBA Under-20 European Championship. He also won a silver medal at the 2009 Mediterranean Games, while playing with the Greek under-26 national team.

References

External links 
EuroCup Profile
FIBA Profile
FIBA Europe Profile
Draftexpress.com Profile
Eurobasket.com Profile
ProBallers.com Profile
RealGM.com Profile
Hellenic Basketball Federation Profile 

1986 births
Living people
Aigaleo B.C. players
Amyntas B.C. players
Centers (basketball)
Dafnis B.C. players
Greek Basket League players
Greek men's basketball players
Ionikos Nikaias B.C. players
Irakleio B.C. players
Kavala B.C. players
Kymis B.C. players
Larisa B.C. players
Maroussi B.C. players
Pagrati B.C. players
Power forwards (basketball)
Basketball players from Larissa
Mediterranean Games medalists in basketball
Mediterranean Games silver medalists for Greece
Competitors at the 2009 Mediterranean Games